Mastin may refer to:

Mastin House, historic residence in Mobile, Alabama
Mastin Moor, village lying just east of Staveley in Derbyshire, United Kingdom
Will Mastin Trio, dancers and singers Will Mastin, Sammy Davis, Sr. and Sammy Davis, Jr.

Persons with the surname Mastin
Francis Mastin Wright (1810–1869), Ohio politician
Reece Mastin (born 1994), British-Australian singer-songwriter
Will Mastin (1878–1975), American entertainer
Turner Mastin Marquette (1831–1894), Nebraska politician
James Mastin (1935–2016), American artist

See also
Masti (disambiguation)
Mastini (disambiguation)
Mastino (disambiguation)